Revolution Recap is a podcast review of the New England Revolution, Major League Soccer and the U.S. national team created by Sean Donahue of New England Soccer Today and the Sports Journal and co-hosted by Greg Johnstone and Tanner Rebelo. The podcast was formerly frequently co-hosted by Brian O'Connell of ESPN Boston and Kris Valukis.

The show was previously live on the radio Sundays from 7-8pm ET on WNRI AM 1380 in 2007 and 2008 and before that on WARL AM 1320 from 2005 and 2006. As a radio show, it featured a guest in the studio each week as well as guests over the phone. Guests included players and coaches from both the Revolution and US National Team as well as local and national soccer writers.

Past guests have included Clint Dempsey, Steve Nicol, Tommy Smyth, Michael Parkhurst, Steve Ralston, Jay Heaps, Jeff Larentowicz and other notable names in U.S. soccer.

References

External links
 Official Site: RevolutionRecap.Podbean.com 
 Revolution Recap on Google Podcasts
 Revolution Recap on iTunes
 Revolution Recap on Spotify
 Revolution Recap Twitter
 Revolution Recap Facebook Page

Revolution Recap